Survival is the act of surviving; to stay living

Survival may also refer to:

Biology
 Self-preservation, behavior that ensures the survival of an organism
 Survival of the fittest

Medicine and statistics 
 Survival analysis, a statistical technique to analyze longevity
 Survival rate, the percentage of people who are alive for a given period of time

People
 Survival Tobita (born 1970), a Japanese professional wrestler

Arts, entertainment, and media

Gaming

Games
 Science Horizons Survival, or Survival, a video game for the ZX Spectrum
 Survival: The Ultimate Challenge, a 2001 PC strategy game by Techland

Other uses in gaming
 Survival game, a genre
 Survival mode, a game mode

Genres 
 Survival film, a film genre
 Survival horror, a genre

Literature 
 Survival!, a 1984 collection of short stories by Gordon R. Dickson
 Survival: A Thematic Guide to Canadian Literature, a 1972 book by Margaret Atwood
 "Survival", a short story by John Wyndham which appears in the collection The Seeds of Time
 Survival (manhwa) (살아남기; Saranamgi), a Korean manhwa comic book

Music

Albums 
 Survival (Bob Marley and the Wailers album), or the title song
 Survival (Born from Pain album), 2008
  Survival (Dave East album), 2019
 Survival (Grand Funk Railroad album), 1971
 Survival (The O'Jays album), or the title song

Songs 
 "Survival" (Drake song), 2018
 "Survival" (Eminem song), 2013
 "Survival" (Muse song), 2012
 "Survival," by Glay from Heavy Gauge
 "Survival," by Madonna from Bedtime Stories
 "Survival", the original name of the song "Eye of the Tiger" by Survivor
 "Survival," by The Moody Blues from Octave
 "Survival," by Yes from the self-titled album

Other uses in music 
 Survival (band), a project of Dutch multi-instrumentalist and composer Jack Langevelt
 Survival Festival, an Australian music festival

Television 
 Survival (Doctor Who), a 1989 Doctor Who television serial
 Survival (Dutch TV program), a 1992 program starring Marjolein Beumer
 Survival (TV series), a UK wildlife documentary programme
 "Survival" (UFO), a 1970 UFO television series episode

Other uses in arts, entertainment, and media
 Survival (journal), a journal published by the International Institute for Strategic Studies

Other uses 
 Survival International, a non-governmental human rights organization working for tribal peoples
 Survival skills, safety techniques used in dangerous situations
 Survivals, traits of culture persisting from earlier times

See also 

 Survivalism, a primarily American movement of individuals preparing for possible disruptions in social or political order
 AWAY: The Survival Series, action-adventure video game
 Survive (disambiguation)
 Survivor (disambiguation)
 Surviving (disambiguation)
 Survival Skill (disambiguation)